Zurab Avalishvili (1876 – May 21, 1944) was a Georgian historian, jurist and diplomat in the service of the Democratic Republic of Georgia (1918–1921). He was also known as Zurab Davidovich Avalov in a Russian manner.

Born in Tbilisi, Georgia (then part of the Russian Empire), into the family of Prince David Avalishvili, he graduated from St. Petersburg University in 1900 and took post-graduate courses at the Department of Law, University of Paris from 1900 to 1903. He became a Docent at the St. Petersburg University in 1904 and a Professor of Public Law at the St. Petersburg Polytechnical Institute in 1907. He was an official adviser to the Russian Ministry of Trade and Commerce for many years.  

After the February Revolution in Russia, Avalishvili was named a Senator by the Provisional Government in May 1917. When Georgia declared independence on May 26, 1918, Avalishvili entered Georgian diplomatic service and was appointed a Deputy Minister of Foreign Affairs. He rendered important services to his homeland as a member of her delegation to the 1919 Paris Peace Conference.    

The Red Army invasion of Georgia forced him into exile in March 1921. He lived thereafter in Germany where he worked as a Professor at the University of Munich. He was one of the founding members of the Georgian Association in Germany and worked for the editorial boards of historical journals Georgica (London) and Byzantion (Brussels). He died in 1944, in Germany, and was reburied to Didube Pantheon, Tbilisi, in 1994.   

Avalishvili’s main works focuses on the history of Georgia and the Caucasus, Georgian literature (e.g., the critical studies of Shota Rustaveli), international law and Georgia’s foreign relations. His The Independence of Georgia in International Politics, 1918-1921 is a detailed and well-documented first-hand account of Georgia’s relations with its neighbors, the nation’s struggle for recognition and its international ramifications in the period of 1918 to 1921. Much of the works is in diary form, the author being judiciously critical of ineptitude of the Caucasian governments.

Some of the main works by Zurab Avalishvili 
 "Joining of Georgia to Russia" (a monograph), St.Petersburg, 1901, 1906 (in Russian)
 "The Independence of Georgia in the International Politics of 1918–1921" (a monograph), Tbilisi, 1925
 "Questions of "The Knight in the Panther's Skin"" (a monograph), Paris, 1931 (in Georgian)
 "Geschichte Georgiens" (a monograph), Muenchen, 1944 (in German)
 "King Teimuraz I and his work "Martyrdom of Queen Ketevan"" (a monograph), Paris, 1938 (in Georgian)
 "History of the Caucasian Politics" (a monograph).- J. "Kavkaz", Muenchen, No 35-40, 1936-1937 (in Russian)
 "Geographie et legende dans un ecrit apocriphe de Saint Basile".- J. "Revue de l'Orient Christien", 3 serie, Paris, 1927–28, t. 6 (26), No 3-4 (in French)
 "A fifteenth-century Georgian painting in the Metropolitan Museum".- J. "Georgica", London, vol. 1, No 1, 1935
 "The Cross from Overseas".- J. "Georgica", London, Vol. 1, No 2-3, 1936
 "La succession du Curopalate David d'Iberie, Dynastie de Tao".- J. "Byzantion", Bruxells, t. 7, 1933 (in French)

References 

Diplomats from Tbilisi
20th-century historians from Georgia (country)
Writers from Tbilisi
1876 births
1944 deaths
Burials at Didube Pantheon
Academic staff of Peter the Great St. Petersburg Polytechnic University